The men's 5000 metres relay at the 2017 Asian Winter Games was held from February 20 to February 22, 2017 in Sapporo, Japan.

Schedule
All times are Japan Standard Time (UTC+09:00)

Results
Legend
PEN — Penalty
q — Qualified by time

Heats

Heat 1

Heat 2

Heat 3

Semifinals

Heat 1

Heat 2

Finals

Final B

Final A

References

Results summary

External links
Official website

Men Relay